Cennamo is a surname, and may refer to;

Cennamo from Old Italian cennamo ‘cinnamon’ (from Latin cinnamum), probably applied as a metonymic occupational name for a spicer. 

 Luigi Cennamo - Greek-Italian-German footballer
 Louis Cennamo - Bass guitarist
 Tony Cennamo - Jazz disc-jockey
 Mary Cennamo Robison - American short story writer and novelist
 Carlo Cennamo - American sax player for The Sorts

References 

Italian-language surnames